Pseudokineococcus marinus is a Gram-positive, aerobic, non-spore-forming and motile bacterium from the genus of Pseudokineococcus which has been isolated from marine sediments from the coast of Jeju in Korea.

References

External links
Type strain of Pseudokineococcus marinus at BacDive -  the Bacterial Diversity Metadatabase

Bacteria described in 2006
Actinomycetia